Brison Manor (August 10, 1952) was an American football defensive end who played eight seasons in the National Football League (NFL) for the Denver Broncos, from 1977–1984, before appearing in six games with Tampa Bay Buccaneers, also in 1984. He played college football at the University of Arkansas.

Manor played high school football at Bridgeton High School.

References

1952 births
Living people
Bridgeton High School alumni
People from Bridgeton, New Jersey
Sportspeople from Cumberland County, New Jersey
Players of American football from New Jersey
American football defensive ends
Arkansas Razorbacks football players
Denver Broncos players
Tampa Bay Buccaneers players